Negro Creek is a  long 2nd order tributary to Hyco Creek in Caswell County, North Carolina.

Course
Negro Creek rises about 2.5 miles southeast of Baynea, North Carolina in Alamance County, and then flows northeasterly into Caswell County to join Hyco Creek about 2 miles south-southeast of Hightowers.

Watershed
Negro Creek drains  of area, receives about 46.5 in/year of precipitation, has a topographic wetness index of 362.36, and is about 54% forested.

References

Rivers of North Carolina
Rivers of Alamance County, North Carolina
Rivers of Caswell County, North Carolina
Tributaries of the Roanoke River